Marijan Brnčić (born 23 July 1940, in Tribalj, near Crikvenica, Kingdom of Yugoslavia) is a former Croatian football player.

Club career
He played as a centre back and central defensive midfielder but he was mostly deployed at left back. With Dinamo Zagreb he won 1966–67 Inter-Cities Fairs Cup. Brnčić was hailed as a player that could be put in any position in defense.

International career
Brnčić made his debut for Yugoslavia in a September 1962 friendly match against Ethiopia, coming on as a 75th-minute substitute for Vlatko Marković , and earned a total of 10 caps scoring no goals. His final international was an October 1967 European Championship qualification match against West Germany.

Club statistics

Managerial statistics

Club

National teams

 *Dates of first and last games under Brnčić; not dates of official appointments

Honours

Player
Dinamo Zagreb
Yugoslav Cup: 1969
Inter-Cities Fairs Cup: 1966-67

Kortrijk
Belgian Second Division play-offs: 1976

Manager
NK Rijeka
Yugoslav Cup: 1979

Croatia 
Futsal Mundialito silver medal: 1994

References

External links
 
 Profile on Serbian federation official site
 Dinamo stats
 Croatian Olympic Committee
 

1940 births
Living people
People from Primorje-Gorski Kotar County
Association football defenders
Yugoslav footballers
Yugoslavia international footballers
Olympic footballers of Yugoslavia
Footballers at the 1964 Summer Olympics
HNK Rijeka players
NK Trešnjevka players
GNK Dinamo Zagreb players
K.S.V. Waregem players
K.V. Kortrijk players
Yugoslav First League players
Belgian Pro League players
Challenger Pro League players
Yugoslav expatriate footballers
Expatriate footballers in Belgium
Yugoslav expatriate sportspeople in Belgium
Yugoslav football managers
Croatian football managers
HNK Rijeka managers
NK Zagreb managers
K.V. Kortrijk managers
HNK Orijent managers
Tunisia national football team managers
Yugoslav expatriate football managers
Expatriate football managers in Belgium
Expatriate football managers in Tunisia
Yugoslav expatriate sportspeople in Tunisia
HNK Rijeka non-playing staff